D-Day is a video game by Games Workshop.

Description
D-Day is a wargame that simulates the Normandy landings of World War II.

Reception
Roger Kean previewed D-Day in Crash #9 (October 1984), calling it "ideal for play-by-mail" and "a classic strategy war game which requires a deal of skill and judgement against another human opponent".

Andrew Miller reviewed D-Day for White Dwarf #60, giving it an overall rating of 9 out of 10, and stated that "The mechanics of the game are so simple anyone can play it, but in terms of strategy, D-Day is second to none."

Home Computing Weekly commented: "Certainly not for the arcade freak. A specialist may appreciate it".

Reviews
Computer & Video Games

References

1984 video games
Europe-exclusive video games
Games Workshop games
Video games developed in the United Kingdom
World War II video games
ZX Spectrum games
ZX Spectrum-only games